Forbestown may refer to:
Forbestown, California, in Butte County
Forbestown, California, former name of Lakeport, California